Dmytro Serhiyovych Hryshko (born 2 December 1985) is a Ukrainian amateur and retired professional footballer who plays as a centre-back for Denhoff Denykhivka. He played most notably for Chornomorets Odesa and Olimpik Donetsk.

Career
Hryshko is a product of his native Spartak Horlivka, where his first trainer was Yuriy Fomenko.

He joined FC Chornomorets Odesa in the 2004 and made his Ukrainian Premier League debut against FC Metalist Kharkiv on 1 March 2005. Prior to the 2010–11 season, Hryshko was elected the vice-captain of Chornomorets.

Career statistics

References

External links
 
 
 
 Profile on Official Chornomorets Website

1985 births
Living people
People from Horlivka
Ukrainian footballers
Association football defenders
Ukraine under-21 international footballers
FC Chornomorets Odesa players
FC Chornomorets-2 Odesa players
FC Olimpik Donetsk players
FC SKA-Khabarovsk players
Ukrainian Premier League players
Ukrainian First League players
Ukrainian Second League players
Russian Premier League players
Ukrainian expatriate footballers
Expatriate footballers in Russia
Ukrainian expatriate sportspeople in Russia
Ukrainian football managers
Sportspeople from Donetsk Oblast